"Soup is Good Food" is an advertising slogan for Campbell's Soup 
 "Soup Is Good Food" is the title of the opening song of the Dead Kennedys' album, Frankenchrist.